Héctor Trejo (15 July 1919 – 15 April 1992) was a Chilean footballer. He played in three matches for the Chile national football team in 1941. He was also part of Chile's squad for the 1941 South American Championship.

References

External links
 

1919 births
1992 deaths
Chilean footballers
Chile international footballers
Place of birth missing
Association football midfielders
Audax Italiano footballers